Emil Mohammed  also known as Farhan Roshan is an Indian music composer, mixing engineer and  sound designer. He is a graduate from SAE School of audio engineering, Chennai. He works predominantly in Malayalam cinema and Kannada cinema Industry. He is known for films such as Mera Naam Shaji directed by Nadirshah Dhairyam (2017 film), Circus (2009 film),Nanda Loves Nanditha, Ragini IPS, Kidi (film) and Namo Bhootatma.

Early life and education
Emil Mohammed  born in Thiruvananthapuram, Kerala to SA Khareem, Nazeera Beevi. Emil studied in Christ Nagar School, Thiruvananthapuram, Muslim Association College of Engineering and  graduated in sound engineering from SAE School of audio engineering, Chennai. During school days he was actively performing music  with  his keyboard.

Music career
He started as Audio engineer and turned  to start  work  for South Indian movies as keyboard programmer and music producer. He become independent music director in Kannada films like Nanda Loves Nanditha. The song Jinkemarina from Nada loves Nandhitha marked his career as music director and is one of the noted songs in Kannada. Later he composed songs for films as Mera Naam Shaji directed by Nadirshah, Dhairyam (2017 film) Circus (2009 film),   Nanda Loves Nanditha and Ragini IPS.

Filmography

References

എമിൽ മുഹമ്മദ്
Profile of Malayalam Musician Emil Muhammed
Emil Muhammed Archives
Emil names his band as Jinkemarina - chitraloka.com | Kannada Movie News, Reviews | Image
Magic Star Yogi Hits | Loose Maada Yogi Super Hit Kannada Song Jukebox - video dailymotion
'Gaja' rocks Kannada music market
Emil new catch! - Telugu News

External links
 IMDb -Emil Muhammed 4823167/

Living people
People from Thiruvananthapuram district
Malayalam film score composers
Kannada film score composers
Indian male film score composers
1984 births